The  is the highest award for adult leaders in the Scout Association of Japan. It is awarded by the Chief Scout of Japan, awarded for eminent achievement and meritorious service to the Association for a period of at least twenty years. It may be awarded to any member of a Scout Association affiliated with the World Organization of the Scout Movement.

The award consists of a medallion depicting a stylized golden pheasant, suspended from a white ribbon with two red stripes worn around the neck. The attendant uniform emblem, worn over the pocket, consists of two red stripes on a white background with a 5 mm golden device of the Japanese Scout emblem.

Background

The original Japanese list does not assign strict chronological numbering, rather by category. The first category is political, and in honorific order as number 1 is the Heisei emperor, although he received the award chronologically third in that category. The second category are Japanese Scouters, again starting with number 1 Michiharu Mishima. The third category are non-Japanese recipients, and again the list cycles back to 1, being Martin B. Williams. In addition, Akira Watanabe is out of numerical sequence.

Posthumously conferred are marked with (‡).

Recipients

See also
 Bronze Wolf of World Scout Committee
 Silver Wolf of The Scout Association
 Silver Wolf of the Norwegian Guide and Scout Association
 Silver Wolf of Scouterna
 Silver Buffalo Award of the Boy Scouts of America
 Order of CúChulainn of Scouting Ireland
 Silver Fish
 Silver Kangaroo Award of Scouts Australia

Notes

References

Scout and Guide awards
Scouting in Japan
Japanese awards
Scouting-related lists